Air Forces of the United States include the current United States Air Force; its executive department; its current, former, and predecessor numbered Air Forces (e.g., Eighth Air Force); or numerous other US organizations (e.g., 3 were designated "… Training Air Force" as "major subordinate units" of Air Training Command). Air Force or Air Forces regarding the United States may also refer to:

Air Forces Iceland
Army Air Forces (AAF), "HQ AAF" at tbd 1941-1947, the World War II US Army organization that became the post-war USAF
Confederate Air Force (Commemorative Air Force in 2002), a civilian preservation and demonstration organization for vintage aircraft
Crew Training Air Force (CTAF), Randolph AFB 1952-7, to train Korean War combat crews and free FTAF "to concentrate on…pilot and observer training programs"
Far East Air Forces
GHQ Air Force
Flying Training Air Force (FTAF), Waco AFB TX 1951-8, the USAF flight school when Air Training Command "split its training responsibilities"
Tactical Air Forces
Technical Training Air Force (TTAF), Gulfport MS 1951-tbd, with "ten stations" for "technical and basic" training and later 7 technical and 10 pilot training bases (TTAF formed when ATC "split its training responsibilities")
United States Air Forces in Europe
Womens Airforce (WAF), which on 12 June I94S became part of the Air Force when "Congress passed the Women's Armed Services Integration Act"

Set index articles